Crighton is a surname. Notable people with the name include:

Cameron Crighton (born 1992), British actor
Crighton Porteous or Crichton Porteous, (1901–1991), British writer
David Crighton FRS (1942–2000), British mathematician and physicist
Hec Crighton (1900–1967), Canadian football coach
Michael Crichton or Michael Crighton, (1942–2008), American author, producer, director, and screenwriter

See also
 
Craigton (disambiguation)
Creighton (disambiguation)
Creightons
Crichton (disambiguation)
Croughton (disambiguation)
 The Admirable Crichton
 Kryten

de:Crighton